區 (or "区") refers to a district in East Asian countries, it  may refer to:

 District (Taiwan)
 District (China)
 List of districts in South Korea
 List of second-level administrative divisions of North Korea
 Ou (surname), a Chinese surname